Frédéric Lajoie-Gravelle (born February 14, 1993) was a Canadian soccer player who played for FC Montreal in the USL. He is also a sociologist known for his study's on the search for meaning.

Career

Professional
Lajoie-Gravelle began his career in France with US Albi on 2010-2011 where he made 16 appearances and scored 6 goals before joining the Montreal Impact Academy in 2013.  In 2014, he played in the Premier Development League for Montreal Impact U23 where he made 11 appearances and finished second on the team in goals with five.

On March 13, 2015, it was announced that Lajoie-Gravelle would join FC Montreal, a USL affiliate club of the Montreal Impact for their inaugural season.  He made his professional debut a month later in a 3–0 defeat to the Rochester Rhinos. He finished the season with 3 goals and 5 assists. He retired from soccer in 2016 to look forward with University of Montreal. After a year away from soccer, he played in the university league (RSEQ) and finished the season top scorer with 7 goals in 8 games and he was selected in the allstar team.

References

1993 births
Living people
Canadian soccer players
Canadian expatriate soccer players
US Albi players
Montreal Impact U23 players
FC Montreal players
Association football forwards
Soccer people from Quebec
Sportspeople from Gatineau
Expatriate footballers in France
USL League Two players
USL Championship players